Brooke Schultz (born January 20, 1999) is an American diver. She competed in the women's 3 metre springboard event at the 2019 World Aquatics Championships.

References

External links
 
 Arkansas bio

1999 births
Living people
American female divers
Place of birth missing (living people)
Pan American Games medalists in diving
Pan American Games silver medalists for the United States
Pan American Games bronze medalists for the United States
Divers at the 2019 Pan American Games
Medalists at the 2019 Pan American Games
21st-century American women